Rajan Mukarung (राजन मुकारुङ; born 24 February 1978) is a writer and novelist of Nepali literature. His novel Damini Bhir was awarded with Madan Puraskar for the year 2012. He is one of the initiators of the movement called Srijanshil Arajakta (Creative Anarchy) along with Upendra Subba and Hangyug Agyat.

Notable works

Published books 
 Seto Aarohan (1999)
 Prarambha Prakshepan (2001)
 Jikirko Gaddi (2002)
 Kirat Sanskar (2004)
 Mithak Maya (2005)
 Hetchhakuppa (2008)
 Damini Bhir (2012)
 Ferindo Saundarya (2015)
 Hata Jane Aghillo Rat (2019)

Edited works 
 Gorkha Sainik Aawaj Monthly (1999–2002)
 Japanko Chakkar (1999)
 Bais Janghar Tarepachhi (2000)
 Nipsung (2001)
 Gorkhali Weekly (2002)
 Birseka Anuharharu (2002)
 Sahitya Samanwaya Bi-monthly (2001–2006)
 Ridum Mundhum (2005)
 Kirati Mission Monthly (2006–2007)
 Annapurna Swarna Jayanti-Smarika (2006)
 Kirat Rai Yayokhha - Smarika (2009)

Plays 

 Khuwalung: Dhunga ko Bato (2022, about Khuwalung)

Awards and felicitations
 Kirat Rai Sahitya Samman - 2001
 Madanswori Memorial Award - 2008
 International Kirat Sahitya Samman - 2008
 Madan Puraskar - 2012
 Pahichan Puraskar - 2016

References

Nepalese male novelists
Madan Puraskar winners
1978 births
Living people
People from Bhojpur District, Nepal
Tribhuvan University alumni
Rai people
21st-century Nepalese male writers